Stuart Little 2 is a 2002 American live action/computer-animated comedy film directed by Rob Minkoff and starring Geena Davis, Hugh Laurie, and Jonathan Lipnicki, and the voices of Michael J. Fox as Stuart Little and Nathan Lane as Snowbell the Cat. Although a sequel to the 1999 film Stuart Little, the plot bears more resemblance to the original novel by E.B. White, in which Stuart and Snowbell meet a canary named Margalo (voiced by Melanie Griffith).
Stuart Little 2 premiered in Westwood on July 14, 2002, and was released in theaters for the rest of North America and United Kingdom on July 19 by Columbia Pictures, and grossed $170 million against a $120 million budget, with it also receiving positive critical reviews. It was followed by a third film, a direct-to-video sequel titled Stuart Little 3: Call of the Wild in 2005.

Plot
Set two years after the events of the first film, Stuart Little has settled into family life with his parents, older brother George, and baby sister Martha, who has yet to say her first words. Stuart is becoming tired of his adoptive mother Eleanor's overprotectiveness due to his small size, and is finding himself lonely when George would rather play with his own friend, Will. When playing by himself, Stuart accidentally wrecks George's toy plane, prompting George to angrily throw it into a trash can. Stuart's adoptive father Frederick tells him there is a 'silver lining' to every bad situation, and encourages him to find a new friend of his own.

When driving home from school in his roadster, Stuart meets Margalo, a canary who falls into his car. Margalo states she has injured her wing being chased by a predatory Falcon, and Stuart takes her home to recover. Unbeknownst to the Littles, Margalo is in fact physically healthy, and is working with Falcon to steal precious items from households. However, she soon bonds with the Littles, and feels immense guilt over what she is planning to do; Falcon warns her that if she does not complete their plan, he will kill Stuart.

Margalo steals Eleanor's ring, prompting Stuart to venture down the Littles' kitchen drain in an unfruitful attempt to find it again. He soon finds himself in trouble, but Margalo rescues him; realizing the danger she is putting him in, she leaves the next morning. Stuart becomes convinced Falcon has kidnapped her, and sets off to find her with the family cat Snowbell, convincing George to conduct a series of elaborate (and extremely unconvincing) lies to Eleanor in order to cover for him.

Stuart and Snowbell seek out street-cat Monty, who tells them that Falcon lives at the top of the Pishkin Building, and warns that he is an extremely dangerous foe. Stuart uses a balloon to fly to the summit of the Pishkin Building, but is taken aback when Margalo reveals her alliance with Falcon. Falcon traps Margalo in a paint can, and attempts to kill Stuart by dropping him from the sky; Stuart instead lands in a garbage truck and is taken to a garbage barge out at sea. Initially devastated at the series of events, Stuart soon finds his silver lining by rediscovering and subsequently repairing George's broken toy plane, which he uses to fly back to land. Meanwhile, George, after being reprimanded by his parents for lying, confesses Stuart's whereabouts to them, prompting them to head out and look for him.

In the meantime, Snowbell has also ventured up the Pishkin Building, and frees Margalo from the paint can, only to become trapped in it himself. Margalo breaks free from Falcon's control, and flies away with Eleanor's ring, prompting Falcon to give chase. Stuart arrives in his toy plane, and a furious chase occurs through New York, with the Littles following from behind. Stuart ultimately wins the battle by using the ring to blind Falcon's vision, before jumping from the plane and allowing it to crash into Falcon as he falls into a trash can and is possibly eaten by Monty. The day saved, Frederick and Eleanor forgive Stuart for running away and George for lying to them, and tell them they are extremely proud of them for their bravery.

Later, Margalo fulfills her dream of flying south for the winter, planning on returning to the Little household in the spring. Martha stuns everyone by using her first words to say goodbye to Margalo.

Cast

Live-action cast
 Geena Davis as Mrs. Eleanor Little, the mother of the Little family and Frederick's wife.
 Hugh Laurie as Mr. Frederick Little, the father of the Little family and Eleanor's husband.
 Jonathan Lipnicki as George Little, the eldest son of the Little family and Stuart's older brother.
 Anna and Ashley Hoelck as Martha Little, the infant daughter of the Little family and Stuart and George's younger sister.
 Marc John Jefferies as Will Wilson, George's loyal best friend.
 Jim Doughan as Stuart and George's soccer coach. Doughan previously voiced Lucky and played the role of Detective Allen in Stuart Little.
 Brad Garrett as Rob, a plumber called to find Eleanor's ring in the kitchen sink's pipes.
 Amelia Marshall as Rita Wilson, Will's mother.
 Ronobir Lahiri as the unnamed Indian-American taxi driver
 Maria Bamford as Stuart and George's teacher.
 Angelo Massagli as Wallace, one of Stuart and George's soccer teammates.
 Kevin Olson as Irwin, another of Stuart and George's soccer teammates.

Voice cast
 Michael J. Fox as Stuart Little, a young anthropomorphic mouse adopted as part of the Little family.
 Melanie Griffith as Margalo, a young anthropomorphic canary whom Stuart meets on his way home from school and becomes his love interest, though it is revealed that she is actually in cahoots with a falcon, who adopted her when she was only a fledgling and forced her into slavery to steal objects from households in exchange for a home.
 Nathan Lane as Snowbell, the family's Persian cat who is Stuart's friend.
 James Woods as The Falcon, a sadistic, greedy peregrine falcon who served as Margalo's master.
 Steve Zahn as Monty, Snowbell's gray tabby cat friend.

Puppeteers

 Greg Ballora
 David Barclay - supervising animation puppeteer
 Kevin Carlson
 David Greenaway
 Greg Manion
 Drew Massey
 Karen Prell
 Michelan Sisti

Production
Filming began in both New York City, and Culver City, California on March 5, 2001, and lasted until June of that year. Also, after the September 11 attacks, parts of the Twin Towers soon ended up digitally removed and scenes were reshot.

Reception

Critical reception
On review aggregator Rotten Tomatoes, the film holds an approval rating of 81% based on 124 reviews, with an average score of 6.90/10. The critical consensus reads, "Stuart Little 2 is a sweet, visually impressive sequel that provides wholesome entertainment for kids." On Metacritic, the film has a weighted average score of 66 out of 100 based on 29 reviews, indicating "generally favorable reviews". Audiences surveyed by CinemaScore gave the film an average grade of "A" on an A+ to F scale.

Ann Hornaday wrote a positive review in The Washington Post, noting how the film's idealized setting makes it family-friendly. Hornaday praised the vocal performances of Fox, Griffith, and Woods in their roles as Stuart, Margalo, and Falcon, respectively, as well as the characters' computer animation: "The animated characters engage in such natural movements and, more important, exude such subtle emotional expression that they mesh seamlessly with their live-action counterparts." Tom Shen of the Chicago Reader,  described the film as "fairly formulaic", but praised its jokes as "hilarious", especially those coming from the character of Snowbell, the Littles' cat.

Box office
The film had an opening weekend gross of $15.1 million. The domestic total was $65 million and the worldwide total was $170 million against an estimated production budget of $120 million, less than its predecessor.

Soundtrack
The soundtrack, Music from and Inspired by Stuart Little 2, was released by Epic Records and Sony Music Soundtrax on July 16, 2002, on Audio CD and Compact Cassette. The tracks in bold do not appear on the film and the final two tracks are score cues composed by Alan Silvestri.

Another album features the entirety of Silvestri's orchestral score for the film.

Video game

Video games based on the film were released for the PlayStation, Game Boy Advance, and Microsoft Windows.

Accolades

Home media
Stuart Little 2 was released on VHS and DVD on December 10, 2002, by Columbia TriStar Home Entertainment, and in the United Kingdom on November 25, 2002. Stuart Little and Stuart Little 2 were released in a combo on Sony PSP's UMD format on January 3, 2006. A Blu-ray/DVD combo pack was released on June 28, 2011, alongside the first film by Sony Pictures Home Entertainment.

References

External links

 
 
 
 

2002 films
2000s adventure comedy films
2000s children's adventure films
2000s children's comedy films
2000s children's fantasy films
2000s English-language films
2000s fantasy comedy films
American adventure comedy films
American children's adventure films
American children's comedy films
American children's fantasy films
American fantasy adventure films
American fantasy comedy films
American films with live action and animation
American sequel films
Animated films about birds
Columbia Pictures films
Films about cats
Films produced by Douglas Wick
Films produced by Lucy Fisher
Films directed by Rob Minkoff
Animated films about mice
Films scored by Alan Silvestri
Films set in New York City
Films shot in Los Angeles
Films shot in New York City
Films with screenplays by Bruce Joel Rubin
Impact of the September 11 attacks on cinema
Stuart Little (franchise)
Films based on novels by E. B. White
2002 comedy films
2000s American films